Grace Bonney is an author, blogger and entrepreneur. Bonney is most well known for founding the interior design blog Design*Sponge, which published for 15 years. Bonney wrote The New York Times bestseller, In The Company of Women, a book featuring more than 100 stories about women entrepreneurs who overcame adversity. Bonney also wrote the DIY interior design book Design*Sponge at Home.

Career

Design*Sponge 
In 2004, Bonney founded the interior design blog Design*Sponge, which is dedicated to intersectional and inclusive conversations about design and cultural issues. The site posted content daily and was dedicated to fostering a creative community. The popular website reached nearly 2 million readers per day for 15 years and was called "one of the internet's most popular design blogs" by Adobe. The last article on Design*Sponge was posted in August 2019 and the entire blog now officially archived in the Library of Congress.

The blog started out as a side project which Bonney ran alongside full-time jobs, first at a design PR firm and later as a freelance writer for multiple interior and design-related publications including House and Garden, Domino, and Craft. As Design*Sponge gained large loyal following (and therefore interest from advertisers), it became the type of job that Bonney had hoped to find at a magazine and by 2009 was making enough revenue to work on it full-time. Becoming popular during this time period of 2004-2009, Bonney has said that Design*Sponge benefitted from being an "early era blog" and being one of the first on the scene. Bonney described the situation then, "When you went on the internet and looked for furniture or interior design, there was only going to be a few of us that popped up. We grew in a way that is nearly impossible to do today, organically."

The focus of the blog evolved over time, reflecting Bonney's own personal evolution and new interests. It moved "away from products to center on people" including addressing "topics such as how gender, classism, and racism, social issues, and diversity connect to and influence design."

Bonney's decision to close the blog was based on the shifting advertising industry, the role of social media and the proliferation of design sites. The changes in the design media landscape meant that advertisers were requesting cheaper ads and it was not enough to sustain the website. Instead of trying to shift the content strategy or "chase clicks", Bonney decided to end the blog after its 15th year.

Good Company 
In 2018, Bonney began publishing the print magazine Good Company: Where Creativity Meets Business. The magazine was inspired by Bonney's book, In the Company of Women. The magazine was created to provide "motivation, inspiration, practical advice, and a vital sense of connection and community for women and non-binary creatives at every stage of life."  Intended to be bi-annual, the magazine ran for three issues.

Personal life 
Bonney was raised in Virginia Beach and attended the College of William & Mary, subsequently moving to New York. Bonney was bullied in middle school and high school for being queer; because of this, Bonney struggled with internalized homophobia until age 30. In October 2003, Bonney met Aaron Coles. They married in 2009 and divorced in 2011. Following the divorce, Bonney publicly came out as queer. 

In 2013, Bonney married chef Julia Turshen. On the LGBTQ&A podcast, Bonney said, "I mean, it's a super stereotypical lesbian story of email, date, moved in three days later, married four months later, dog, house, all the cliches." Bonney identifies as queer. Bonney was diagnosed with Type 1 diabetes at the age of 35.

Bonney has spoken out about how women have unrealistic expectations about work and life balance, and believes it is important for women to learn about successful role models. Bonney was noted for entrepreneurial work in the Frederick Douglass 200 project, which honors the impact of 200 living people who embody the spirit and work of Frederick Douglass.

Bonney came out as non-binary in 2022 and no longer uses she/her pronouns.

Published work 

 Design*Sponge at Home (2014), Artisan; 
 In the Company of Women: Inspiration and Advice from over 100 Makers, Artists, and Entrepreneurs (2016), Artisan; 
 Collective Wisdom: Lessons, Inspiration, and Advice from Women over 50 (2021), Artisan;

References

Living people
American women bloggers
American bloggers
American women writers
1981 births
21st-century American women